Bielany is a district in Warsaw located in the north-western part of the city.

Initially a part of Żoliborz, Bielany has been an independent district since 1994. Bielany borders Żoliborz to the south-east, and Bemowo to the south-west. Its north-eastern border is the Vistula River, and the northern-western border is also the limits of the city of Warsaw.

The name 'Bielany', which in Polish is plural, derives from the white habits of the Camaldolese monks who have an ancient priory there. It is also known for the Józef Piłsudski University of Physical Education in Warsaw, which was established 1929 when it was known as the Central Institute for Physical Education (C.I.W.F.), as well as the newly built Cardinal Stefan Wyszyński University.

Neighbourhoods
Chomiczówka
Huta
Las Bielański
Marymont-Kaskada
Marymont-Ruda
Młociny
Piaski
Placówka
Radiowo
Stare Bielany
Słodowiec
Wawrzyszew
Wólka Węglowa
Wrzeciono

International relations

Twin towns - Sister cities

Bielany is twinned with:

 Ealing, London, United Kingdom

See also
 Camaldolese Church, Warsaw

References

External links